Lucien Moussa Shukri Soulban is a Saudi Arabian game designer and writer who has worked primarily on role-playing games.

Personal life
Lucien Soulban was born in Saudi Arabia, where he lived for 12 years before attending school in Texas. He later moved to Montreal.

Career
Lucien Soulban wrote game material for White Wolf, Dream Pod 9, and other companies before being hired by Guardians of Order in 2000, and began work on Heaven & Earth (2001). Soulban also developed Guardians of Order's superhero role-playing game Silver Age Sentinels (2002). He subsequently went to White Wolf Games  where he wrote the Orpheus role playing game and a tie-in novel for Vampire: The Requiem.

Soulban was a guest at Otakuthon in 2007, and 2008.

His D&D work includes the game supplement Children of the Night: The Created (1999), and Dragonlance novels such as The Alien Sea (2006) and Renegade Wizards (2009).

He has written the script for the games: Tom Clancy's Rainbow Six: Vegas, Far Cry 3, Far Cry 3: Blood Dragon, Far Cry 4. and Watch Dogs 2.

References

External links
 
 Home page

Canadian game designers
Dungeons & Dragons game designers
Living people
Saudi Arabian game designers
Saudi Arabian novelists
Ubisoft people
White Wolf game designers
Year of birth missing (living people)